Alexander Raban Waugh (8 July 1898 – 3 September 1981) was a British novelist, the elder brother of the better-known Evelyn Waugh, uncle of Auberon Waugh and son of Arthur Waugh, author, literary critic, and publisher. His first wife was Barbara Jacobs (daughter of the writer William Wymark Jacobs), his second wife was Joan Chirnside and his third wife was Virginia Sorenson, author of the Newbery Medal-winning Miracles on Maple Hill.

Biography
Waugh was born in London to Arthur Waugh and Catherine Charlotte Raban, a great-granddaughter of Lord Cockburn (1779–1854), and educated at Sherborne School, a public school in Dorset. The result of his experiences was his first, semi-autobiographical novel, The Loom of Youth (1917), in which he dramatised his schooldays. The book was inspired by Arnold Lunn's The Harrovians, published in 1913 and discussed at some length in The Loom of Youth. 

The Loom of Youth was so controversial at the time (it mentioned homosexual relationships between boys, albeit in a very understated, staid fashion) that Waugh remains the only former pupil to be dismissed from the old boys' society (The Old Shirburnian Society). It was also a best seller. (The Society's website gives a different version: Alec and his father resigned and were not reinstated until 1933, while Evelyn went to a different school. In 1932, the book was again the subject of controversy when Wyndham Lewis's Doom of Youth seemed to suggest that Waugh's interest in schoolboys was because he was a homosexual. This was settled out of court. In the mid-1960s Alec donated the original manuscript, press clippings and correspondence with the publisher to the Society.) 

Waugh served in the British army in France during the First World War, being commissioned in the Dorset Regiment in May 1917, and seeing action at Passchendaele. Captured by the Germans near Arras in March 1918, he spent the rest of the war in prisoner-of-war camps in Karlsruhe and in the Mainz Citadel. Waugh married his first wife, Barbara Annis Jacobs (1900–1996), in 1919. 

He later had a career as a successful author, although never as successful or innovative as that of his younger brother. He lived much of his life overseas, in exotic places such as Tangier – a lifestyle made possible by his second marriage in 1932 to a rich Australian, Joan Chirnside. His work, possibly in consequence, tended to be reminiscent of W. Somerset Maugham, although without achieving Maugham's huge popular success. Nevertheless, his 1955 novel Island in the Sun was a best-seller. It was filmed in 1957 as Island in the Sun, securing from Hollywood the greatest amount ever paid for the use of a novel at that time. His 1973 novel A Fatal Gift was also a success, though his nephew Auberon Waugh said Waugh "wrote many books, each worse than the last".

He was a wine connoisseur, and published In Praise of Wine & Certain Noble Spirits (1959), a light-hearted and discursive guide to the major wine types, and Wines and Spirits, a 1968 book in the Time-Life series Foods of the World.

Waugh also merits a mention in the history of reggae music. The success of the film adaptation of Island in the Sun and the Harry Belafonte title track provided inspiration as well as the name for the successful Island Records record label.

In 1969, Waugh married the author Virginia Sorensen, and they resided together in Morocco, then moved to the United States as his health failed. He died in Florida at the age of 83.

Works 

The Loom of Youth (1917); London; New Delhi; New York; Sydney : Bloomsbury Reader, 2012, 
Resentment Poems (1918)
The Prisoners of Mainz (1919)
Pleasure (1921)
Public School Life: Boys, Parents, Masters (1922)
The Lonely Unicorn (1922)
Myself When Young : confessions (1923)
Card Castle (1924)
Kept : a story of post-war London (1925)
Love In These Days (1926)
On Doing What One Likes (1926)
Nor Many Waters (1928)
The Last Chukka: Stories of East and West (1928)
Three Score and Ten (1929)
Portrait of a Celibate (1929)
"...'Sir,' She Said" (1930)
The Coloured Countries (1930)
Hot Countries  (1930), with woodcuts by Lynd Ward
Most Women (1931)
So Lovers Dream (1931)
Leap Before You Look (1932)
No Quarter (1932)
Thirteen Such Years (1932)
Wheels Within Wheels (1933)
The Balliols (1934)
Jill Somerset (1936)
Eight Short Stories (1937)
Going Their Own Ways (1938)
No Truce With Time (1941)
His Second War (1944)
The Sunlit Caribbean (1948)
These Would I Choose (1948)
Unclouded Summer (1948)
The Sugar Islands: a Caribbean travelogue (1949)
The Lipton Story (1950)
Where the Clocks Chime Twice (1951)
Guy Renton (1952)
Island in the Sun (1955)
Merchants of Wine: House of Gilbey (1957)
The Sugar Islands: a collection of pieces written about the West Indies between 1928 and 1953 (1958)
In Praise of Wine (1959)
Fuel for the Flame (1959)
My Place in the Bazaar (1961)
The Early Years of Alec Waugh (1962)
A Family of Islands: A History of the West Indies 1492 to 1898 (1964)
Mule on the Minaret (1965)
My Brother Evelyn and Other Portraits (1967)
Foods of the World: Wines and Spirits (1968)
A Spy in the Family (1970)
Bangkok: the story of a city (1970)
A Fatal Gift (1973)
A Year to Remember : a reminiscence of 1931 (1975)
Married to a Spy (1976)
The Best Wine Last : an autobiography through the years 1932–1969 (1978)

Bibliography 
Fathers and Sons: The Autobiography of a Family; by Alexander Waugh, 2004.
New York Life: Of Friends and Others; by Brendan Gill, 1994.

References

External links

 
Alec Waugh and The Loom of Youth at Sherborne School Archives
 Finding aid to Alec Waugh papers at Columbia University. Rare Book & Manuscript Library.

1898 births
1981 deaths
Writers from London
People educated at Sherborne School
Dorset Regiment officers
British Army personnel of World War I
Alec
20th-century English novelists
Bisexual men
English LGBT writers
British World War I prisoners of war
World War I prisoners of war held by Germany
Military personnel from London